Jalan Templer is a major road in Petaling Jaya city, Selangor, Malaysia. It was the first road built in Petaling Jaya and was called Jalan 1 or Road 1. The road was named after the former British High Commissioner in Malaya, Sir Gerald Templer.

Landmarks
SJK (T) Viviekananda
Maktab Kerjasama Malaysia (MKM)
Petaling Jaya Assumption Church
Assunta Hospital
Sultan Abdul Aziz Shah Jamek Mosque

List of junctions

Roads in Petaling Jaya